is a Japanese 3D CGI short anime series produced by Shin-Ei Animation and TIA in collaboration with Okinawan ice cream chain Blue Seal Ice Cream and toy company Takara Tomy. It is directed by Juria Matsumura (TsukiPro the Animation) and written by Hiroko Fukuda (Amanchu! Advance) with character designs done by Aya Matsui. It aired on TV Tokyo through its Kinder TV children's variety program from April to June 2021. A second season premiered in July 2022.

Setting
iii Icecrin is a short series aired in a two minute format with the setting of the show is a place named Ice Cream town where people socialize and meet with each other and its denizens being animals based on the 15 various flavors sold by Blue Seal Ice Cream. Each episode focuses on a certain character in the series in their everyday antics but when problems arose, they solve it through teamwork and dedication. Also as a running theme in the series, the characters can melt in hot conditions, requiring them to go to a freezer to freeze their bodies back in shape.

Each episode were narrated by Shigeo Takahashi of the comedy duo Savanna.

Characters
There are 15 main characters in the series, as depicted in the official website:

Media

Anime
iii Icecrin first aired on in TV Tokyo as one of the segments in the Children's Variety Program Kinder TV on January 5, 2021 with Takara Tomy later streaming the series on YouTube in Japan. Medialink licensed the series for both South Asia and Southeast Asia territories, and is streaming on its Ani-One YouTube channel.

On May 9, 2022, a second season was announced and premiered on July 2, 2022.

Takara Tomy later released a special dance music video of the series featuring the comedy duo Savanna. The series is also confirmed for both DVD and Blu-ray release in the future.

Manga
A 4-koma manga written and illustrated by Yuzuki-iro began serialization on Hakusensha's Manga Park app on April 6, 2021.

References

External links
  
 

2021 anime television series debuts
Animated television series about animals
Hakusensha manga
Medialink
Shin-Ei Animation
TV Tokyo original programming